XEGH-AM (620 kHz) is a Spanish-language radio station that serves the McAllen, Texas (USA) / Reynosa, Tamaulipas (Mexico) border area.

The broadcast tower is around 10 miles from the United States border in Mexico.

History
XEGH received its concession on March 30, 1995. The callsign had been assigned 25 years earlier, in August 1970, when the station was made available for bidding. Montemayor Ibarra initially owned the station for Grupo ACIR.

In 2016, XEGH became an AM simulcast of XHCAO-FM 89.1.

External links

 raiostationworld.com; Radio stations serving the Rio Grande Valley

References

Spanish-language radio stations
Radio stations in Reynosa